Jacob Carlos (born July 12, 2001) is a Canadian soccer player who plays as a midfielder.

Early life
Carlos played youth soccer with the Erin Mills Eagles. In 2016, he joined the youth system of Swedish club IK Frej. In 2017, he joined the youth system of Portuguese club Académico de Viseu. He also played with his former club Erin Mills Eagles during the 2017 and 2018 summers, winning Ontario Cups both years, winning a total of three during his youth career. In 2018, he joined the Toronto FC Academy.

University career
In 2020, he began attending Ryerson University, where he would play for the men's soccer team. His debut was delayed until the 2021 season due to the COVID-19 pandemic. During his rookie season he scored two goals and added two assists in 11 games. He did not return to the school team in 2022.

Club career
Carlos was selected in the second round (11th overall) by Canadian Premier League club Valour FC in the 2022 CPL-U Sports Draft. On April 1, he signed a developmental contract with the club for the 2022 season. He made his debut on April 10, in a substitute appearance against FC Edmonton.

References

External links

2001 births
Living people
Association football midfielders
Soccer players from Mississauga
Canadian people of Portuguese descent
Canadian Premier League players
Canadian soccer players
IK Frej players
Académico de Viseu F.C. players
Toronto FC players
Valour FC players
Valour FC draft picks